John Kresse (born April 17, 1943 in Brooklyn, New York) is an American basketball coach and writer.

He is former head coach of the College of Charleston Cougars and assistant coach with the New York Nets and St. John's University. Kresse has the 5th highest winning percentage (.797) of any Division 1 NCAA college basketball coach with 560 wins and 143 losses during his 23 years as head coach of the College of Charleston. Kresse retired from coaching duties in 2002.  In 2005, Kresse was inducted into the National Association of Intercollegiate Athletics Hall of Fame.  The John Kresse Arena is named after him. Prior to the 2008–2009 basketball season, the College of Charleston moved to the Carolina First Arena where the playing surface is named John Kresse Court in honor of the coach.  In 2009, Kresse was inducted into the New York City Basketball Hall of Fame.

Kresse coached the College of Charleston to the 1983 NAIA basketball title. One of the teams the Cougars defeated in the 1983 NAIA tournament was Chaminade, which had earlier in the season defeated a great Virginia team led by Ralph Sampson. In 1990, the College of Charleston moved from NAIA to NCAA Division I, and soon became known as a giant killer. Over the next few years, North Carolina, Georgia Tech, Maryland, Stanford, and other major power programs would fall to the Cougars.

Head coaching record

Selected bibliography
 The Complete Book of Man-To-Man Offense (with Richard Jablonski) 
 Attacking Zone Defenses (with Richard Jablonski)

References

1943 births
Living people
American men's basketball coaches
American men's basketball players
Basketball coaches from New York (state)
Basketball players from New York City
College men's basketball head coaches in the United States
College of Charleston Cougars men's basketball coaches
Sportspeople from Brooklyn
St. John's Red Storm men's basketball coaches
St. John's Red Storm men's basketball players